Columbia Motors was a Detroit, Michigan, United States based automobile manufacturer that produced automobiles from 1916 to 1924.

Columbia Motors was incorporated in 1916, with John George Bayerline as company president and William E. Metzger as vice-president. Bayerline was the former president and general manager of the King Motor Car Company and former general manager and founder of the Warren Motor Car Company.  Prior to founding Columbia, Metzger was a founder of the E-M-F Company which was later purchased by the Studebaker Corporation.

Columbia Motors produced two models powered by Continental six-cylinder engines including the popular Columbia Six. In 1916, Columbia bought Argo Electric. A 1916 news item in the journal Horseless Age presents a "Columbia Touring Car". In 1923, Columbia acquired Liberty Motor Car.

See also
Brass Era car
List of defunct United States automobile manufacturers

References
Wise, David Burgess, Encyclopedia of Automobiles, 

 
Motor vehicle manufacturers based in Michigan
Defunct motor vehicle manufacturers of the United States
American companies established in 1917
Vehicle manufacturing companies established in 1917
Vehicle manufacturing companies disestablished in 1924
1917 establishments in Michigan
1924 disestablishments in Michigan